The tailless tenrec (Tenrec ecaudatus), also known as the common tenrec, is a species of mammal in the family Tenrecidae. It is the only member of the genus Tenrec. Native to Madagascar, it is also found in the Comoros, Mauritius, Réunion, and Seychelles, where it has been introduced. Its natural habitats are subtropical or tropical forest, grassland, and shrubland, savanna, arable land, pastures, plantations, rural gardens, and urban areas.

The tailless tenrec is the largest species of the tenrec family, Tenrecidae. It has medium-sized, coarse grey to reddish-grey fur and long, sharp spines along its body. This animal is omnivorous, with a diet consisting of invertebrates and animals such as frogs and mice, as well as leaves. If threatened, this tenrec will scream, erect its spiny hairs to a crest, jump, buck and bite. It shelters in a nest of grass and leaves under a rock, log or bush by day. It gives birth to a litter of as many as 32 young, with an average litter between 15 and 20 after a gestation of 50–60 days; when young, they have a black-and-white striped appearance. Despite being sometimes known as the tailless tenrec, they have a small tail  in length.

The tenrec is the first known tropical mammal found to hibernate for long stretches without arousal periods, up to nine months at a time. The Tailless tenrec is a host of the Acanthocephalan intestinal parasite Promoniliformis ovocristatus.

References

Afrosoricida
Mammals described in 1778